Bedhead may refer to:

 Bedhead (band), a Texas-based indie rock band active in the 1990s
 Bedhead (film), a 1991 short film made by director Robert Rodriguez
 BedHead, a 2014 Australian web series broadcast by ABC iview
 Bed Head, a range of haircare products
 Headboard (furniture), a piece of furniture that attaches to the head of a bed